Trilobovarium is a genus of trematodes in the family Opecoelidae.

Species
Trilobovarium diacopae (Nagaty & Abdel Aal, 1962) Martin, Cutmore & Cribb, 2017
Trilobovarium ira (Yamaguti, 1940) Martin, Cutmore & Cribb, 2017
Trilobovarium khalili (Ramadan, 1983) Martin, Cutmore & Cribb, 2017
Trilobovarium krusadaiense (Gupta, 1956) Martin, Cutmore & Cribb, 2017
Trilobovarium lineatum (Aken'Ova & Cribb, 2001) Martin, Cutmore & Cribb, 2017
Trilobovarium moretonense (Aken'Ova & Cribb, 2001) Martin, Cutmore & Cribb, 2017
Trilobovarium palauense (Machida, 2004) Martin, Cutmore & Cribb, 2017
Trilobovarium parvvatis Martin, Cutmore & Cribb, 2017
Trilobovarium truncatum (Linton, 1940) Martin, Cutmore & Cribb, 2017

References

Opecoelidae
Plagiorchiida genera